The Saashörner are a multi-summited mountain of the Lepontine Alps, located east of Oberwald in the canton of Valais.

References

External links
Saashörner on Hikr

Mountains of the Alps
Alpine three-thousanders
Mountains of Valais
Lepontine Alps
Mountains of Switzerland